This is the list of governments of Veneto since 1970.

 
Politics of Veneto